Conferenceville is  1984 Australian TV movie based on a 1976 novel by Frank Moorhouse.

Plot
Delegates attend a multi-racial UNESCO conference. Dr Cindy Broughton is raped by three Aboriginal delegates but refuses to press charges.

Cast
John Gaden as Ian Selfridge, a writer
Robyn Nevin as Dr Cindy Broughton
Ray Barrett
Kevin Miles
Robin Ramsey

Reception
The Sydney Morning Herald said "it's not a bad production nor is it badly acted... fairly enjoyable. There is some funny lines parodying the jargon used by academics."

References

External links

Conferenceville at AusLit
Conferenceville at Screen Australia

Australian television films
Works by Frank Moorhouse
Films directed by Julian Pringle
1980s English-language films
1984 films
1984 television films
1980s Australian films